I Dismember Mama (also known as Poor Albert and Little Annie and released in the UK as Crazed), is a 1972 American horror film written by William Norton and directed by Paul Leder. The film centers on a violent sex criminal who goes on a killing spree while watching over the daughter of one of his victims. During its original theatrical release, patrons were given free paper "Up Chuck Cups" with the purchase of a ticket. There is a well-known US trailer advertising a double feature of this film paired with the 1972 horror film The Blood Spattered Bride which was filmed in the style of a news report covering the "story" of an audience member who had gone insane while watching the films. The title is a pun on the famous play I Remember Mama; however, the film is not comedic in tone.

Plot 
Albert (Zooey Hall) has tried to kill his rich, snobbish mother once, for which he was institutionalized. The low-security hospital she has sent him to, however, is not prepared to deal with the extent of his problems.  Obsessed with his own hatred for his mother, Albert is dangerously violent toward all women and attacks a nurse, after which his doctor decides to send him to a high-security state institution. Albert easily escapes by murdering an orderly and the police put his mother in hiding after he phones her and threatens her. When Albert returns to his mother's home, he finds her housekeeper Alice (Marlene Tracy), whom he tortures and murders.

When Alice's 9-year-old daughter Annie (Geri Reischl) returns home from school, Albert immediately takes a liking to her and tells her that her mother has gone to the hospital and left him to take care of Annie while she is away. Albert reverts to a childlike persona and they immediately form a friendship, playing games, talking and laughing together. Albert takes Annie on a day of doing activities like riding paddleboats and a small train and that night he takes her to a hotel where they conduct a mock wedding ritual. Albert considers Annie to be a pure "woman" and he truly loves her. When his sexual attraction to her manifests itself while she is sleeping, instead, Albert goes out and picks up a woman in a bar and brings her back to the hotel room. His bizarre sadism comes out again and he murders the woman, but Annie wakes up and sees it happening. She screams and escapes out of a window, climbing down the fire escape with Albert chasing after her. They run into a mannequin factory, where Annie attempts to hide among the figures. Albert sees her, and envisions her wearing makeup like a harlot and decides she is just like all the other women after all. When he attempts to kill her with a cleaver, Annie defends herself by holding one of the mannequins in front of herself. She pushes Albert backwards and he falls out of a fourth story window onto the concrete below. The police arrive moments later and comfort Annie, while Albert lies dying on the ground.

Cast

 Zooey Hall as Albert
 Geri Reischl as Annie
 Joanne Moore Jordan as Mrs. Robertson
 Greg Mullavey as a detective
 Marlene Tracy as Alice
 Frank Whiteman as Dr. Burton
 Elaine Partnow as a nurse 
 Rosella Olsen as a girl in poolroom 
 Robert Christopher as a man in poolroom 
 James Tartan as an attendant

Production

I Dismember Mama was directed by exploitation filmmaker Paul Leder. 
Principal photography began in 1972 under the title Poor Albert and Little Annie, with a planned release date that same year.

Release

Home media
The film made its DVD debut on April 21, 2009, and was released by Substance.

Critical response

TV Guide panned the film calling the film's production "shabby" but also noted that actor Zooey Hall's performance as Albert as "interesting".
Author and independent filmmaker John Kenneth Muir awarded the film one out of a possible four stars, commenting that, although the performances were solid and it was technically well made, the film's theme of pedophilia went too far, to the point of being exploitative. On this theme, Muir wrote, "I Dismember Mama makes one feel dirty about watching because its main concern is not just violence, but sex. The film makes it plain that Albert sees little Annie as a possible sexual conquest, and that is really disturbing thing to see in a film with no aspirations to be anything but entertainment." Joseph A. Ziemba from Bleeding Skull! gave the film a negative review, writing, "I Dismember Mama is somewhat suspenseful and definitely bizarre. However, given the subject matter and so-so execution, it’s not something I’d ever want to see again." Blockbuster Inc.'s Guide to Movies and Videos rated the film one out of four stars, calling it "junk".

See also
 List of American films of 1972

References

External links
 
 
 
 
 

1972 films
1970s exploitation films
1972 horror films
1970s serial killer films
1970s slasher films
American exploitation films
American serial killer films
American slasher films
Films about pedophilia
Films scored by Herschel Burke Gilbert
1970s English-language films
1970s American films